Ulf Kleander (born 7 January 1947) is a Swedish former footballer who played as a defender.

References

Association football defenders
Swedish footballers
Allsvenskan players
Malmö FF players
1947 births
Living people